Grevillea mcgillivrayi is a species of flowering plant in the family Proteaceae and is endemic to Queensland in Australia. It is slender tree with linear to strap-like leaves, and cylindrical clusters of white to cream-coloured flowers, the style sometimes turning pink with age.

Description

Taxonomy
This grevillea was first formally described in 1975 by Donald McGillivray who gave it the name Grevillea coriacea, but that name is a nomen illegitimum because it was already used for a fossil species. In 2014, Ian Mark Turner changed the name to Grevillea mcgillivrayi in Annales Botanici Fennici.

Distribution and habitat
Grevillea mcgillivrayi grows in forest and woodland, often on dry slopes, and is found in north-eastern Queensland from north of Cooktown to Mount Mulligan and Mount Molloy.

Conservation status
This grevillea is listed as of "least concern" under the Queensland Government Nature Conservation Act 1992.

References

mcgillivrayi
Proteales of Australia
Flora of Queensland
Plants described in 1975
Taxa named by Donald McGillivray